Legoland Discovery Center Kansas City is an indoor family entertainment center located in the Crown Center in Kansas City, Missouri. The attraction includes Lego rides, a soft play area, a 4D cinema and a gift shop. LEGOLAND® Discovery Center Kansas City is owned and operated by the British leisure group Merlin Entertainments.

History
LEGO® bricks were invented by Danish carpenter Ole Kirk Kristiansen in 1958. The LEGO® employees were often interrupted by visitors who wanted to see what they could build with LEGO bricks. So one day someone came up with the idea to build a park where visitors could build with bricks. The first Legoland Discovery Center was opened in Berlin in 2007, and since then a total of 12 LEGOLAND® Discovery Centers have been opened. LEGOLAND® Discovery Center Kansas City was opened in 2012.

Rides & Attractions

 LEGO® Factory Tour where visitors can learn how LEGO bricks are made
 LEGO® 4D Cinema showing 4D films featuring popular LEGO characters throughout the day
 Kingdom Quest Laser Ride where visitors must zap the ogres, rats and cats and keep an eye out for treasure chests!
 A LEGO replica of the local area in MINILAND®
 Merlin's Apprentice Ride where visitors can pedal to lift off the ground and look over the rest of Legoland Discovery Center Kansas City
 LEGO® Master Builder Academy offers classes with LEGOLAND® Discovery Center's Master Model Builders
 The LEGOLAND® Discovery Center Shop with over 900 products
 DUPLO® Village features a play slide, large animal models, and DUPLO bricks to build with
 Visitors can build a LEGO tower and test its strength on the Earthquake Tables
 Opportunity to meet the five LEGO® Friends- Stephanie, Olivia, Andrea, Mia, and Emma- build a LEGO microphone, and perform on the karaoke stage
 Café serving food, drinks and snacks
 Birthday Rooms for exclusive use as part of LEGOLAND® Discovery Center's Party Package
 LEGO® City Play Zone features the Fire Academy, Coastguard Tower, and Construction Site

References

Legoland
Buildings and structures in Kansas City, Missouri
Tourist attractions in Kansas City, Missouri